Savenkov (masculine) or Savenkova (feminine) is a Russian surname. Notable people with the surname include:

Andrey Savenkov (born 1975), Kazakhstani ice hockey player
Maria Savenkov (born 1988), Israeli Olympic rhythmic gymnast 

Russian-language surnames